"Girl Talk" is a popular song composed by Neal Hefti, with lyrics written by Bobby Troup. It was written for the 1965 film Harlow, a biographical film about Jean Harlow, starring Carroll Baker.

Background
The song has been described by Michael Feinstein as the "last great male chauvinistic song written in the '60s".

Partial list of recordings
Julie London, Feeling Good (1965) (wife of lyricist Bobby Troup)
Tony Bennett, The Movie Song Album (1966)
Sérgio Mendes, The Great Arrival (1966) (instrumental version)
Harry James,  The Ballads And The Beat! (Dot DLP 3669 and DLP 25669, 1966)
The Kenny Burrell Quartet, The Tender Gender (1966)
Chris Montez, Foolin' Around (1967)
Richard "Groove" Holmes, Super Soul (1967)
Oscar Peterson, Girl Talk (1968)
Betty Carter, Finally, Betty Carter (1969), Betty Carter at the Village Vanguard (1970)
Herb Alpert & The Tijuana Brass, Warm (1969)
Claude Nougaro, "Dansez sur moi (Girl Talk)", Locomotive d'or (1973)
The King's Singers, Out of the Blue (1974) (choral arrangement by Patrick Gowers)
Greg Phillinganes, Significant Gains (1981)
Ella Fitzgerald, Joe Pass, Speak Love (1983)
Marla Gibbs, Alaina Reed Hall, Jackée Harry and Helen Martin, 227 (1985)
Johnny Griffin & Clémentine Continent Bleu (1987)
Holly Cole, Girl Talk (1990)
Billy May, Ultra Lounge: Vol. 16 Mondo Hollywood (1997)
Eliane Elias, I Thought About You (2013)
Esperanza Spalding & Fred Hersch, Live at the Village Vanguard EP (2020)
Vanessa Rubin, Girl Talk, Telarc (2001)

References

1965 songs
Songs with music by Neal Hefti
Songs written by Bobby Troup
1960s jazz standards
Claude Nougaro songs